Alexander Mebane, Jr. (November 26, 1744 – July 5, 1795) was a U.S. Congressman from the state of North Carolina from 1793 to 1795. He was also a brigadier general in the North Carolina militia during the Revolutionary War.

Early life
Alexander Mebane, Jr.  was one of twelve children born to Alexander Mebane, Sr. and Mary Tinnin. Born in Lancaster County in the Province of Pennsylvania, he moved to Hawfields, North Carolina, by the time his father received a land grant in 1754. Mebane attended common schools in Orange County. He served as a delegate to the Provincial Congress of North Carolina in 1776, was named justice of the peace in 1776, the first sheriff of Orange County under statehood in 1777, and auditor of the Hillsborough district in 1783 and 1784.

Military service
Alexander served in the following positions during the American Revolution: 
 Colonel in the Southern Orange County Regiment of militia (1776–1777)
 Colonel over the Orange County Regiment of militia (1777–1780)
 Commissary General for the State of North Carolina, with the rank of Brigadier General (1780–1783)
 Colonel of the horse for the Hillsborough District (1788)
 General of the Hillsborough District (1789)

Political career
Mebane was an anti-federalist member of the conventions in Hillsborough in 1788 and in Fayetteville in 1789 which considered ratification of the United States Constitution. Mebane served in the North Carolina House of Commons from 1787 to 1792 and was elected to the 3rd United States Congress in 1792, where he served one term (March 4, 1793 – March 3, 1795).  He was re-elected to the 4th United States Congress, but died before the term began.  Mebane was one of the original trustees of the University of North Carolina at Chapel Hill.

Death
Alexander Mebane, Jr. died at Hawfields in Orange County, on July 5, 1795, shortly after he finished his first term in Congress.  He is buried at First Hawfields Burying Ground, Cheeks Township, Orange County, North Carolina.

Mebane, North Carolina is named for him.

References

1744 births
1795 deaths
Members of the North Carolina House of Representatives
Members of the United States House of Representatives from North Carolina
Militia generals in the American Revolution
People from Lancaster County, Pennsylvania
People from Alamance County, North Carolina
North Carolina sheriffs
18th-century American politicians
North Carolina militiamen in the American Revolution
Military personnel from Pennsylvania
Alexander